Sven Verbrugge (Schoten, 21 August 1967) is a retired Belgian sidecarcross passenger and triple Sidecarcross World Champion, winning the title in 2005, 2006 and 2011.

Verbrugge started racing motocross in 1983 in the 125 cc solo class before becoming a sidecarcross passenger in 1986. In his career, he has raced for over 20 years in the Belgian, Dutch and the world sidecarcross championships. After his second world championship in 2006, Sven retired from the world championship, but felt, according to himself, "homesick" for the GP circus and returned for the 2008 season alongside his countryman Nicky Pulinx.

Apart from two world championships, he also won the Belgian title in 1993, 1994, 2004 and 2006 and the Dutch in 2001 and 2006.

Sidecarcross world championship results
Sven Verbrugge joined the sidecarcross world championship in 1993 as the passenger of his countryman Gunther Gooverts, whom he raced with quite successfully for four seasons. He made his debut at the French GP in Pernes Les Fontaines on 4 April 1993. He won his first race in this season in Roggenburg, Switzerland on 15 August 1993. In 1995, an ankle injury prevented him for three month from taking part in most of the season but the year after the pair returned with a sixth place overall finish. After those four seasons, Verbrugge had two lean ones with only four races in 1997 and none in 1998 after Gooverts choose not to take part in the world championship and only race in domestic events in Belgium. He raced successfully with two different drivers in 1999, Martin Gölz and Gerton Kops, who finished 12th and 9th overall this season. After a short stint with Peter Steegmans he returned to Daniël Willemsen for a second time and the pair finished second overall in the 2000 and 2001 world championship. In 2002, apart from Willemsen, he also raced with Are Kaurit, with both drivers finishing in the top four. Another second-place finish, now with Kristers Serģis, in 2003, when his old partner Willemsen won the championship was followed by a seventh place in 2004 due to a three-month-long injury for Serģis. After this, the two drivers, Willemsen and Serģis, swooped partners, with Verbrugge returning to Willemsen for a third time and Kaspars Stupelis joining Serģis instead. This move proved very successful for Verbrugge as he managed to win two world championships with Willemsen. After the second one, Verbrugge left the world championship in 2006, seemingly for good, at the age of 39. After a year away from the GP circus however, he decided to return, now with his new partner, fellow Belgian Nicky Pulinx.

In 2009, he was back as passenger of Daniël Willemsen once more, except in the first race of the season, when he raced with Gerrit van Werven. The pair dominated the early part of the season but an injury to Willemsen forced them to miss three events and a lack of good form upon return caused them to finish only fifth in the world championship. In the last event of the season, Verbrugge broke his thumb and the team was unable to score any points. Daniël Willemsen however declared already before the race that he would try to win title number eight in 2010.

After riding with fellow Belgian Peter Steegmans in 2010, Verbrugge started once more with Willemsen in 2011, after an injury to first-choice passenger Roman Vasyliaka. It is the fifth time that the two are racing together in the competition. As Willemsens passenger, Verbrugge has also won two Dutch national titles, in 2001 and 2006. Willemsen temporarily switched to Ondrej Cermak as his passenger for the first of two German GP's because of an injury to Verbrugge. Willemsen and his passenger clinched the World Championship at the second-last race of the season, at Slagelse, Denmark, having a 53-point lead over Latvians Jānis and Lauris Daiders at the time.

The last race event of the 2011 season saw the World Champions, Willemsen and Verbrugge, failing to score any points. A dispute during qualifying between the two lead to Verbrugge walking out during the first qualifying session. He later returned to take part in the "last chance", where the team qualified for the race after all. Verbrugge however was injured during a fall and had to be taken to hospital where his arm was placed into a plaster, ruling the team out of the race.

In the 2012 season Verbrugge was racing with fellow Belgian pilot Ben Adriaenssen, finishing third in the world championship.

Season by season
Sven Verbrugge's season by season world championship results:

Source:
 Passengers in italics.

Honours

World Championship
 Champions: (3) 2005, 2006, 2011
 Runners-up: (4) 2000, 2001, 2002, 2003

Belgium
 Champions: (4) 1993, 1994, 2004, 2006

Netherlands
 Champions: (2) 2001, 2006

Germany
 Champions: (1) 2010

References

External links
 Sven Verbrugges official website (in Dutch)
 The World Championship on Sidecarcross.com

1967 births
Living people
Belgian sidecarcross riders
People from Schoten
Sportspeople from Antwerp Province